Parkbeg is a hamlet in Wheatlands Rural Municipality No. 163, Saskatchewan, Canada. The hamlet is located at the junction of Highway 1 and Highway 627 approximately 58 km directly west of the City of Moose Jaw on the Trans Canada Highway.

Demographics

Parkbeg, like so many other small communities throughout Saskatchewan, has struggled to maintain a sturdy population causing it to become a semi ghost town with only a few citizens. Prior to December 31, 1957, Parkbeg was incorporated under village status, but was restructured to hamlet status under the jurisdiction of the Rural municipality of Wheatlands on that date.

Climate

Services

Parkbeg has a café that also serves as a post office, and a grain elevator owned by Paterson Grain which is serviced by the Canadian Pacific Railway.

Gainer the Gopher

Gainer the Gopher is the mascot of the Saskatchewan Roughriders, a Canadian Football League team. He is from Parkbeg.

See also 
 List of communities in Saskatchewan
 Hamlets of Saskatchewan

References

Wheatlands No. 163, Saskatchewan
Former villages in Saskatchewan
Unincorporated communities in Saskatchewan
Ghost towns in Saskatchewan